Fausto Romitelli (1 February 1963 – 27 June 2004) was an Italian composer.

Life and career
Romitelli was born on 1 February 1963 in Gorizia. He studied composition at the Milan Conservatory and subsequently took part in courses at the Accademia Musicale Chigiana in Siena with Franco Donatoni and at the Scuola Civica di Milano. He moved to Paris in 1991 where he became a student of Hugues Dufourt and Gérard Grisey. From 1993 to 1995 he was compositeur en recherche at IRCAM.

His video opera An Index of Metals (2003) was awarded the Franco Abbiati Prize of Italian music critics in 2004.

He died aged 41 on 27 June 2004 in Milan following a long battle with cancer.

Works

1980s
Suite for chamber ensemble, 1982 (unpublished)
Dia Nykta for solo flute, 1982
Versilia for soprano and orchestra, 1983 (unpublished)
Lustralis for wind quintet, 1983 (unpublished)
Solare for solo guitar, 1983
Dimensioni for 16 performers, 1984 (unpublished)
Highway to Hell for solo guitar, 1984
Furit aestus for soprano and instrumental quintet, 1985
Invita la sua ninfa all'ombra for soprano and cello, 1986 (text by Giovan Battista Marino)
Ganimede for solo viola, 1986
Ariel song for voice and guitar, 1987 (unpublished)
Pallide sabbie for orchestra, 1987 (unpublished)
Coralli for solo guitar, 1987
Simmetria d'oggetti for recorder and guitar, 1987–88
Have your trip for harp, guitar and mandolin, 1988–89
Kû for 14 performers, 1989
Meridiana for orchestra, 1989–90

1990s
Spazio – Articolazione for 32 performers and amplification systems, 1990
Nell'alto dei giorni immobili for 6 performers, 1990
Natura morta con fiamme for string quartet and electronics, 1991
La Lune et les eaux for 2 guitars, 1991
La sabbia del tempo for 6 performers, 1991
Mediterraneo – I. Les idoles du soleil for ensemble, 1992
Mediterraneo – II. L'azur des déserts for voice and 14 instruments, 1992–93
Your time is over for cello and ensemble, 1993
Golfi d'ombra for solo percussion, 1993
Acid Dreams and Spanish Queens for ensemble, 1994
Seascape for contrabass recorder, 1994
EnTrance for soprano, ensemble and electronics, 1995
Domeniche alla periferia dell'impero. Prima domenica for 4 instruments, 1995–96
Cupio Dissolvi for 14 performers, 1996
The Nameless City for strings and bells ad libitum, 1997
Lost for voice and 15 instruments, 1997
Music for László Moholy-Nagy's film Ein Lichtspiel, schwarz-weiss-grau for recorder, double bass, guitar, percussion and piano, 1997
Professor Bad Trip: Lesson I for 8 performers and electronics, 1998
Professor Bad Trip: Lesson II for ensemble, 1998–99
The Poppy in the Cloud for choir and ensemble, 1999

2000s
Professor Bad Trip: Lesson III for ensemble, 2000
Blood on the Floor, Painting 1986 for ensemble, 2000
Domeniche alla periferia dell'impero. Seconda domenica: hommage à Gérard Grisey for 4 instruments, 2000
Flowing down too slow for string orchestra, percussion and bells, 2001
Amok Koma for ensemble and electronics, 2001
Chorus for percussionists, 2001
Trash TV Trance for electric guitar, 2002
An Index of Metals, video opera for soprano, ensemble, multiple projections and electronics (text: Kenka Lekovich, video: Paolo Pachini, Leonardo Romoli, 2003
Dead City Radio Audiodrome for orchestra, 2003
Green, Yellow and Blue for ensemble, 2003

Discography
 Fausto Romitelli, Cupio dissolvi, Ensemble Phoenix Basel, MGB, 2008, (with works by Jim Grimm, Beat Furrer, Jorge Sánchez-Chiong and Alex Buess), MGB 110.
 —, Audiodrome [orchestral works]: Dead City Radio. Audiodrome; EnTrance; Flowing Down Too Slow; The Nameless City, Orchestra Sinfonica Nazionale della RAI with Peter Rundel, Stradivarius, 2005, STR33723.
 —, Paolo Pachini, An Index of Metals, Ictus Ensemble with Georges-Elie Octors (conductor) and Donatienne Michel-Dansac (soprano), Cyprès, 2003.
 —, Professor Bad Trip, Ictus Ensemble, Cyprès, 2003.
 —, The Nameless City, Musiques Nouvelles, Jean-Paul Dessy, Cyprès, 2012.
 —, Anamorphosis, Talea Ensemble, Tzadik, 2012.
 —, Nell'alto dei giorni immobili and remixes, Zagros. Remixes by Diego Capoccitti, Neil Kaczor, Andrea Mancianti and WK569, altremusiche.it / Sincronie, 2012, am002.

Sources
 
 Fausto Romitelli, Société de musique contemporaine du Québec (SMCQ)

External links
 

1963 births
2004 deaths
Italian classical composers
Italian male classical composers
Milan Conservatory alumni
People from Gorizia
Pupils of Gérard Grisey
20th-century Italian musicians
20th-century Italian male musicians